Decade of Hits is the first greatest hits album by Canadian country music artist George Canyon. It was released on September 9, 2014, by Big Star Recordings. The album features fifteen of Canyon's biggest singles. It also includes two new songs, "Slow Dance" and "Crazy Love", both of which were released as singles. Decade of Hits was also released on vinyl.

Critical reception
Bob Mersereau of CBC.ca gave the album a favourable review, calling it "everything you want in a best-of from a favourite artist." Mersereau wrote that "for a guy who grew up small-town, and lives on an Alberta ranch now, he doesn't push the cliche cowboy lyrics like so many of his Nashville peers, who own far fewer country credentials." He described the new songs as "a couple of strong love songs that move the country star just a little out of his comfort zone."

Track listing

Chart performance

Singles

References

2014 compilation albums
George Canyon albums